Afouène Gharbi (born October 15, 1980) is a retired Tunisian footballer who was most recently the manager of Saudi Arabian club Najran.

Career
Gharbi has appeared for Étoile du Sahel in the CAF Champions League 2007, and he has scored once, against Maranatha FC on April 21, 2007. Gharbi signed a 6-month contract with Shat on January 16, 2010, agreeing to remain at the Zaawiyat-ad-Dahmani club until the end of the 2009–10 season.

After retiring he became a manager.

On 3 November 2021, Gharbi was appointed as manager of Najran.

References

External links

1980 births
Living people
People from Béja
Tunisian footballers
Olympique Béja players
Étoile Sportive du Sahel players
Tunisian Ligue Professionnelle 1 players
Tunisian expatriate footballers
Expatriate footballers in Libya
Tunisian expatriate sportspeople in Libya
Association football midfielders
Tunisian football managers
ES Hammam-Sousse managers
CO Médenine managers
ES Métlaoui managers
Najran SC managers
Tunisian Ligue Professionnelle 1 managers
Saudi First Division League managers
Tunisian expatriate football managers
Expatriate football managers in Saudi Arabia
Tunisian expatriate sportspeople in Saudi Arabia